NG-19 is the nineteenth planned flight of the Northrop Grumman robotic resupply spacecraft Cygnus and its sixteenth flight to the International Space Station (ISS) under the Commercial Resupply Services (CRS-2) contract with NASA. The mission is scheduled to launch in April 2023. This is the eighth launch of Cygnus under the CRS-2 contract.

Orbital ATK (now Northrop Grumman Innovation Systems) and NASA jointly developed a new space transportation system to provide commercial cargo resupply services to the International Space Station (ISS). Under the Commercial Orbital Transportation Services (COTS) program, Orbital ATK designed, acquired, built, and assembled these components: Antares, a medium-class launch vehicle; Cygnus, an advanced spacecraft using a Pressurized Cargo Module (PCM) provided by industrial partner Thales Alenia Space and a Service Module based on the Orbital GEOStar satellite bus.

History 
Cygnus NG-19 is the eighth Cygnus mission under the Commercial Resupply Services-2 contract. Northrop Grumman Innovation Systems confirmed on 23 February 2021 that Thales Alenia Space of Turin, Italy, will fabricate two additional Pressurized Cargo Modules (PCMs) for a pair of forthcoming Commercial Resupply Services-2 missions. Current plans are for the two additional Cygnus spacecraft to be designated NG-18 and NG-19.

Production and integration of Cygnus spacecraft are performed in Dulles, Virginia. The Cygnus service module is mated with the pressurized cargo module at the launch site, and mission operations are conducted from control centers in Dulles, Virginia and Houston, Texas.

Spacecraft 

This will be the fourteenth flight of the Enhanced-sized Cygnus PCM.

Manifest 

 Crew supplies:          
 Science investigations: 
 Spacewalk equipment:    
 Vehicle hardware:       
 Computer resources:

Research 
The new experiments arriving at the orbiting laboratory will inspire future scientists and explorers, and provide valuable insight for researchers. 

NASA Glenn Research Center studies: 
 TBD

See also 
 Uncrewed spaceflights to the International Space Station

References

External links 
 Northrop Grumman Commercial Resupply, NASA page

Cygnus (spacecraft)
Supply vehicles for the International Space Station
2023 in spaceflight